The Best of John Scofield is a compilation album by jazz musician John Scofield. All tracks except "Tom Thumb" (previously unreleased) can be found on Scofield recordings during his tenure on Blue Note Records from November 1989 until June 1995.

Musicians
This John Scofield album consists of John Scofield, Pat Metheny, Bill Frisell (guitar); Joe Lovano, Eddie Harris (tenor saxophone); Howard Johnson (tuba); Randy Brecker (trumpet); Charlie Haden, Dennis Irwin, Marc Johnson (bass); Don Alias (percussion); Joey Baron, Jack DeJohnette, Idris Muhammad, Bill Stewart (drums).

Track listing

"So Sue Me"
"Flower Power"
"Big Fan"
"Camp Out"
"Call 911"
"You Bet"
"Message To My Friend"
"Tom Thumb" - (previously unreleased)
"Do Like Eddie"
"Kool"

References

Post-bop albums
Albums produced by Michael Cuscuna
Albums produced by Bob Belden
1996 greatest hits albums
John Scofield compilation albums
Blue Note Records compilation albums